Lazy Mary may refer to:
 "Lazy Mary (Luna Mezzo Mare)", an Italian-American wedding tarantella
 "Lazy Mary, Will You Get Up", a British nursery rhyme